Yvonne Caples (born 14 June 1972) is an Indian-born American former professional boxer who competed between 1999 and 2014. She held the IFBA light flyweight title in 2003 and challenged for multiple world championships during her career; the WIBF light flyweight title in 2002; the WIBA minimumweight title twice in 2004 and 2005; and the WBC female light flyweight title in 2005.

Professional career
Caples became a professional boxer in 1999. Before fighting for the world championship, she had to meet the likes of Kim Messer, Elena Reid and former world champion Para Draine before meeting Regina Halmich in Germany for the WIBF world Jr. Flyweight title, on 17 August 2002. She lost the fight by a majority decision.

Three months later, on 22 November, she found herself inside a boxing ring in Guam, where she fought Anissa Zamarron for the vacant WIBA Light Flyweight Intercontinental championship, and Caples was defeated by 5th round technical knockout, stopped on a cut in a fight in Caples was winning on all scorecards.

Caples finally reached her dream of becoming a world champion when she defeated Mary Duron on 26 July 2003 in Costa Mesa, California by a ten-round unanimous decision for the vacant IFBA world Jr. Flyweight title.

Caples then travelled to Trinidad to challenge Ria Ramnarine for the vacant WIBA Mini Flyweight World Title. Caples lost a controversial 10-round split decision.

Professional boxing record

Personal life
Caples attended the University of California, Berkeley where she received a Bachelor of Arts in English. She also has a M. Ed in Curriculum and Instruction with an emphasis in Technology Integration and an M.S. in Sports Coaching. She has made a career in education as a high school teacher and Technology Integration Specialist.

References

External links
Official Web Site
Women Boxing Archive Network

1972 births
Sportspeople from Pune
Living people
American women boxers
UC Berkeley College of Letters and Science alumni
Sportswomen from Maharashtra
American sportspeople of Indian descent
Mini-flyweight boxers
21st-century American women